Sir George Bracewell Smith, 2nd Baronet MBE, (12 December 1912 – 18 September 1976), was  a City of London business man who owned the Ritz Hotel and several others.

Background and education
The son of Sir Bracewell Smith, 1st Baronet, KCVO (1884–1966), he was educated at Wrekin College and Emmanuel College, Cambridge.

Family
Bracewell Smith married Helene Hydock, from Philadelphia, in 1951.  They had two sons, Guy Bracewell Smith and Charles Bracewell-Smith.

Career
Bracewell Smith was a City of London business man. He was Chairman of the Park Lane Hotel and the Ritz Hotel and a director of Arsenal Football Club. He sold the Ritz Hotel to Trafalgar House for £2.75m in 1976.

He was a director of Arsenal Football Club from 1953 to 1976, his father having been chairman from 1948 to 1962.

References

1912 births
1976 deaths
Baronets in the Baronetage of the United Kingdom
Members of the Order of the British Empire
People educated at Wrekin College
Alumni of Emmanuel College, Cambridge